Soghan Rural District is a rural district (dehestan) in Soghan District, Arzuiyeh County, Kerman Province, Iran. At the 2016 census, its population was 14,723, in 3,200 families. The rural district has 53 villages.

References 

Rural Districts of Kerman Province
Baft County